The Jazz Festival Enkhuizen was founded in 1974 in Enkhuizen, Netherlands. Since, it has grown into a four-day festival with both domestic and foreign jazz artists. In recent years, the event is held in the first weekend of June. The Enkhuizen Jazz Festival is known for its historic downtown (largely dated from the Dutch Golden Age) in which mostly young jazz artists are programmed on the in- and outdoor stages.

Artists who performed at the festival 
 Beryl Bryden (United Kingdom)
 Boogie Boy (Belgium)
 Chris Barber (England)
 Goodluck (South Africa)
 Jazz Five (Denmark)
 Jean Shy (United States)
 Jonny Boston (United Kingdom)
 King Pleasure and the Biscuit Boys (United Kingdom)
 Lillian Boutté (United States)
 Max Collie's Rhythm Aces (United Kingdom)
 Pink Turtle (France)
 Rosenberg Trio (The Netherlands)
 Shannon Powell (United States)

External links
Jazz Festival Enkhuizen

Jazz festivals in the Netherlands
Tourist attractions in North Holland
Music festivals established in 1974
1974 establishments in the Netherlands